Scarus scaber, the five-saddle parrotfish or dusky-capped parrotfish, is a species of marine ray-finned fish, a parrotfish, in the family Scaridae. It is native to Indian Ocean.

Description
This species grows to a maximum 37 cm in length and 900 g in weight.

Distribution
This species is widely distributed in the Indian Ocean (and around the islands therein) from western Thailand and northwest Indonesia in the east (southwards to Cocos-Keeling), and west to the coast of Africa (as far south as Natal and north to Red Sea and Gulf of Aden).

Habitat
This species is either solitary, or forms small schools.

References

Taxa named by Achille Valenciennes
Fish described in 1840
scaber